Manuel Gouveia (2 June 1923 – 1 June 1986) was a Portuguese gymnast. He competed in eight events at the 1952 Summer Olympics.

References

External links

1923 births
1986 deaths
Portuguese male artistic gymnasts
Olympic gymnasts of Portugal
Gymnasts at the 1952 Summer Olympics
20th-century Portuguese people